Ebolowa Airport  is a public use airport located  southeast of Ebolowa, Sud, Cameroon. Google Earth satellite image shows airstrip is overgrown with vegetation.

See also
List of airports in Cameroon

References

External links 
 Airport record for Ebolowa Airport at Landings.com

Airports in Cameroon
South Region (Cameroon)